Phichit is one of Thailand's seventy-six provinces (changwat) lies in lower northern Thailand and 330 km due north of Bangkok. Neighbouring provinces are (from north clockwise) Phitsanulok, Phetchabun, Nakhon Sawan, and Kamphaeng Phet.

Geography 

The Nan and Yom Rivers flow through Phichit province, joining shortly before the Chao Phraya is formed. The province mainly consists of low fertile river plains, making rice and lotus the main crops. The total forest area is just  or 0.4 percent of provincial area.

History
The town of Phichit was established in 1058 by Phraya Kotabongthevaraja (พระยาโคตระบอง), and was first part of the Sukhothai Kingdom, and later of Ayutthaya. An old temple in Pho Prathap Chang District is Wat Pho Prathap Chang (วัดโพธิ์ประทับช้าง). It was built by Phra Chao Suea, an Ayutthaya king, in 1701 at a site reputed to be his birthplace. The site is surrounded by double-walls and huge trees, some of which are over 200 years old.

The name of the main city changed several times. At first it was called Sa Luang ('city of the royal pond'). In Ayutthaya times it was called Okhaburi ('city in the swamp'), and then finally Phichit ('beautiful city').

Symbols
The provincial seal shows a pond, which refers to the old name of Phichit, Mueang Sa Luang ('city of the royal pond'). The banyan tree in front refers to Wat Pho Prathap Chang. The temple was built in 1669–1671 by King Luang Sorasak, who was born in the village of Pho Prathap Chang, between a banyan and a sacred fig.

The flag of Phichit shows the circular provincial seal in the middle. It has three green bars and two white horizontal bars, with the middle bar being interrupted by the seal.

The provincial tree is the ironwood. The provincial flower is the lotus.

The provincial motto (loosely translated) states as follows:

The province of Chalawan the crocodile king, the fun and exciting annual boat race, the land of exquisite rice and the delicious Tha Khoi pomelo; the center of the province is the Luang Pho Phet.

Health 
The main hospital in Phichit is Phichit Hospital, operated by the Ministry of Public Health.

Transport

Rail
Phichit main station is Phichit railway station.

Administrative divisions

The province is divided into 12 districts (amphoes). These are further divided into 89 subdistricts (tambons) and 852 villages (mubans).

Local government
As of 26 November 2019 there are: one Phichit Provincial Administration Organisation and 28 municipal (thesaban) areas in the province. Phichit, Taphan Hin and Bang Mun Nak have town (thesaban mueang) status. There are a further 25 subdistrict municipalities (thesaban tambon). The non-municipal areas are administered by 73 Subdistrict Administrative Organisations (SAO) (ongkan borihan suan tambon).

Human achievement index 2017

Since 2003, United Nations Development Programme (UNDP) in Thailand has tracked progress on human development at sub-national level using the Human achievement index (HAI), a composite index covering all the eight key areas of human development. National Economic and Social Development Board (NESDB) has taken over this task since 2017.

Notable people
Suriyenthrathibodi: 29th King of Ayutthaya
Sanan Kachornprasart: politician
Yodrak Salakjai: luk thung singer
Santi Duangsawang: luk thung singer
Busaba Athisthan: luk thung singer
Chuchart Trairatanapradit: professional snooker player
 Den Junlaphan, also known as Eagle Kyowa: professional boxer
Jirayu Tangsrisuk (James): actor, singer, model

References

External links

Provincial website

Phichit provincial map, coat of arms, and postal stamp

 
Provinces of Thailand